

The Letov Š-31 was a fighter aircraft produced in Czechoslovakia in the early 1930s in a number of variants. All of the aircraft had metal tubular framing and fabric covering with a metal engine cowling.

The first flight of the definitive and highly altered Š.231 version was on March 17, 1933. After testing at the Czechoslovak flight facility at Prague-Lethany, modifications were undertaken to improve the machine's performance. It entered production the following year and began equipping Czech fighter units in June 1936. The machines however did not remain in frontline fighter status with the Czechoslovak Air Force until the German occupation of Czechoslovakia in 1939.  
The sole Š.331 and 22 out of 24 produced Š.231s were sold to representatives of the Spanish Republican government. Reports of their combat record in the Spanish Civil War are vague, but at least three machines survived the war and were used by victorious Nationalists. The operational performance and ultimate fate of the Š.331 is unrecorded.

While the Š.31, Š.131, Š.231, and Š.431 had engines of 480 to 680 hp, the Š.331 had a  Walter K.14 engine, giving it outstanding performance for an aircraft of the early 1930s.

Operators 
 Czechoslovakia
Czechoslovakian Air Force

Slovak Air Force (1939–45)

Spanish Republican Air Force

Spanish Air Force – Post civil war.

Variants 

 Š-31 – initial version with Walter-built Bristol Jupiter (33 built)
 Š-131 – racing version with BMW-built Pratt & Whitney Hornet (three built)
 Š-231 – main production version with Walter-built Bristol Mercury engine
 Š-331 – version with Walter K.14 engine (one built)
 Š-431 – version with Armstrong Siddeley Tiger engine (one built)

Specifications (Š-231)

See also

References

External links

Letov S.231/S.331/Spain (Republicans)

1920s Czechoslovakian fighter aircraft
Letov aircraft
Biplanes
Single-engined tractor aircraft
Aircraft first flown in 1929